Vladimir Koshelev (born 1 October 1974, Kuybyshev) is a Russian political figure and a deputy of the 8th State Dumas.
 
From 1999 to 2005, Koshelev worked as deputy director of the Aviacor JSC. In 2006, he led the privatization of the company's construction division. In the same year, he was elected chairman of the board of directors of the Aviacor construction corporation, which in 2014 was renamed the Koshelev-project. In 2011, he was appointed the advisor to the Governor of the Ulyanovsk Oblast. From 2016 to 2021, he was the deputy of the Samara Regional Duma of the 6th convocation. Since September 2021, he has served as deputy of the 8th State Duma.

References
 

 

1974 births
Living people
Liberal Democratic Party of Russia politicians
21st-century Russian politicians
Eighth convocation members of the State Duma (Russian Federation)
Politicians from Samara, Russia